5cm may refer to:

 The 5 centimeters band, a radio frequency band in the United States
 An imprint of Hong Kong clothing company I.T
 5 Centimeters Per Second, a Japanese anime film
 5 cm (film), an Indonesian film